Sumanthiran Navaratnam (born 21 May 1925), also known as Sumana Navaratnam or Summa Navaratnam, is a Sri Lankan former track and field athlete, Sri Lankan rugby union player, coach and business executive. He is regarded as one of the finest sportspeople from Sri Lanka. He is currently the oldest living Sri Lankan athlete at the age of 96 as of 2021.

Personal life 
Navaratnam was born on 21 May 1925 in Araly, Vaddukoddai, Jaffna, Northern Province. He was born as the fifth child in his family. His father SS Navaratnam was a civil servant.

Navaratnam married Sri Lankan-born British-American best-selling author  Rosemary Jansz and the couple had two daughters, Rosanne and Sharon. The couple later divorced and Rosemary moved to London with her daughters in 1960. He was later married to Romaine and has two children.

Career 
Navaratnam established himself as a reputed prominent distinguished sportsman at the Royal College in Colombo where he pursued his primary and secondary education. He rose to limelight as a school athlete at Royal College at the age of fifteen as he became the youngest Royalist to be awarded the Royal College athletics colours. He also went onto captain the Royal College rugby and athletics teams.

He was chosen to represent Ceylon at the dual meet against India in 1945 (Indo-Ceylon Dual Athletic Meet) where he competed in the men's 4×100 yards relay event alongside Duncan White, R. E. Kitto and Basil Henricus. He was then overlooked from the Sri Lankan contingent which participated at the 1948 Summer Olympics and in 1952 Summer Olympics due to nepotism with the selection process at that time.

Navaratnam represented Ceylon at the 1950 British Empire Games which was held in Auckland, New Zealand and competed in the men's 100 yards, men's 220 yards and in men's events. He finished at fifth position in the men's heats 100 yards competition and he couldn't progress to semifinal. He was also slated to compete in the men's 200 yards event but he didn't start and was disqualified. He also teamed up with fellow prominent track and field athletes Duncan White, John de Saram and Oscar Wijesinghe in the men's 4 × 110 yards event where Sri Lanka finished at fourth position during the 1950 British Empire Games.

He was fondly called as "the fastest man in Asia" after clocking at record 10.04 seconds at the India States Olympic Meet which was held in Madras in 1953. It was also regarded as the fastest timing recorded on a grass track in Asian soil. He began his athletics coaching career with Royal College in 1953. He retired from athletics in 1955 and pursued his career as a professional rugby player.

Navaratnam was also part of the Ceylon rugby team which played in an unofficial match against the touring British Lions in 1950 where the British Lions defeated Sri Lanka 44-6. He was just one of three local native Sri Lankans along with Leslie Ephraims and Clair Roeloffsz to have been selected to play for the Ceylonese rugby team which was otherwise dubbed as an "All-white" Sri Lankan team. He also captained the Ceylonese Rugby & Football Club and under his captaincy CR & FC won the Clifford Cup in 1954.

Navaratnam was elected as the President of the Ceylon Rugby Football Union in 1972 and was also re-elected as the President of the Sri Lanka Rugby Football Union in 1974. He also joined the Royal (Ceylon) Air Force. He also later went onto become rugby coach of Royal College, Colombo Rugby Football Union and the national team. He also started the Summa Navaratnam Junior Rugby Academy and began coaching to young kids.

In addition, Navaratnam pursued his mercantile career as a Junior Trading Executive of Dodwell & Company in Colombo. After the closure of Dodwell's company, he joined the Stores & Sales Department of Colombo Commercial Company. On his return to Sri Lanka in around 1989, he became general manager of Consolexpo corporation where he served in the relevant position for a period of three years. He became general manager at the Ceylon and Foreign Trades PLC in 1993 and served in the position for about 16 years before his retirement in 2009. He was also appointed on the board of Ceylon and Foreign Trades and its subsidiaries.

References 

1925 births
Living people
Alumni of Royal College, Colombo
Athletes (track and field) at the 1950 British Empire Games
Commonwealth Games competitors for Sri Lanka
People from Jaffna District
Sri Lankan male sprinters
Sri Lankan rugby union players
Sri Lankan Tamil businesspeople
Sri Lankan Tamil sportspeople